Eoin Davis (born 2000) is an Irish hurler who plays as a goalkeeper for club side St Catherine's and at inter-county level with the Cork senior hurling team.

Honours

Cork
All-Ireland Under-20 Hurling Championship: 2020
Munster Under-20 Hurling Championship: 2020
All-Ireland Under-17 Hurling Championship: 2017
Munster Under-17 Hurling Championship: 2017

References

2000 births
Living people
St Catherine's hurlers
Cork inter-county hurlers
Hurling goalkeepers